Antony Dupuis (born 24 February 1973) is a French retired professional tennis player.


Personal life
Dupuis began playing tennis at the age of nine with his father Xavier. He mentioned in an interview once that he prefers clay and hard court surfaces. He was coached by Benoit Carelli, whom he credits with improving his physical and mental ability. Carelli had coached Dupuis since February 1998.

Career
Dupuis won one singles title in Milan in 2004 and reached a career-high singles ranking of World No. 57 in September 2001. In 2005, at the Valencia tournament, Dupuis became the first French player to defeat Novak Djokovic. In 2006 he tested positive for the banned drug Salbutamol and was suspended for two and a half months.

ATP career finals

Singles: 2 (1 title, 1 runner-up)

Doubles: 1 (1 title)

ATP Challenger and ITF Futures finals

Singles: 23 (12–11)

Doubles: 2 (0–2)

Performance timelines

Singles

See also
List of doping cases in sport

References

External links 
 
 

1973 births
Living people
Doping cases in tennis
French male tennis players
French sportspeople in doping cases
Sportspeople from Bayonne